Baeckea elderiana is a species of flowering plant in the family Myrtaceae and is endemic to central Western Australia.

Description

Taxonomy
The species was first formally described by the botanist Ernst Georg Pritzel in 1904 in Engler's journal Botanische Jahrbücher für Systematik, Pflanzengeschichte und Pflanzengeographie in an article by Pritzel and Ludwig Diels entitled Fragmenta Phytographiae Australiae occidentalis.

Specimens were originally collected by Richard Helms during the Elder expedition that left Adelaide in April 1891 and reached Geraldton in 1892. The species is named after Thomas Elder who had financed the expedition.

Distribution and habitat
This baeckea is found on sandplains, rises and stony ridges in the Mid West, Wheatbelt and Goldfields-Esperance regions of Western Australia where it grows in sandy, loamy and stony soils.

References

Flora of Western Australia
elderiana
Plants described in 1904
Taxa named by Ernst Pritzel